Liangjiang may refer to:

 Viceroy of Liangjiang, regional viceroy of China during the Qing Dynasty, consisting of Jiangnan and Jiangxi provinces

Locations in China 
 Liangjiang New Area, Chongqing
 Guilin Liangjiang International Airport, the main airport serving Guilin, Guangxi
 Liangjiang Township, Xupu County, Hunan
Towns
 Liangjiang, Laibin, in Xingbin District, Laibin, Guangxi
Written as "":
 Liangjiang, Guangdong, subdivision of Lechang, Guangdong
 Liangjiang, Guilin, subdivision of Lingui District, Guilin, Guangxi
 Liangjiang, Nanning, subdivision of Wuming District, Guangxi
 Liangjiang, Jilin, subdivision of Antu County, Jilin